Charles Michael Durkee (born June 25, 1944 in Tulsa, Oklahoma) is a former professional American football player. In 1967, Durkee became the first kicker for the expansion New Orleans Saints. 
Durkee was with the Saints in 1967 and 1968, and again in 1971 and a portion of the 1972 season. He did not play in the NFL in 1969 or 1970.

Durkee's most productive season was in 1968, when he was responsible for 84 points as the Saints' kicker. He made 19 of 37 field goal attempts and 27 out of 27 extra points. However, the Saints would use Tom Dempsey in 1969 and 1970. Although Dempsey made a 63-yard field goal to win a game against Detroit in 1970, an NFL record at the time, he was traded by the Saints to the Philadelphia Eagles in 1971. Durkee then returned to the Saints, serving as their kicker in 1971 and part of the 1972 season.

References

1944 births
American football placekickers
New Orleans Saints players
Oklahoma State Cowboys football players
Living people
Sportspeople from Tulsa, Oklahoma